Ptochus limbatus, is a species of weevil found in India, Sri Lanka and Pakistan.

Description
This species has a body length is about 7.5 to 8 mm. Body reddish brown in color, where the dorsum covered with dense brown scales. Ventrum with uniform pale green or greenish-grey scales. There is a well-defined lateral stripe on the head and thorax. Head finely striolate beneath the scales. Eyes are large, sub-lateral and convex. Rostrum broad, which gradually narrowed from the base. Antennae ferruginous. Protthorax broad with slightly rounded sides. Scutellum distinct, and clothed with green scales. Elytra narrowly elliptical in male and considerably wider in female.

Adults were collected from Juglans regia.

References 

Curculionidae
Insects of Sri Lanka
Beetles described in 1916